Whispering Wires is a 1926 American mystery film directed by Albert Ray and written by William Conselman and Gordon Rigby. It is based on the 1918 novel Whispering Wires by Henry Leverage, which was also made into a stage play. The film stars Anita Stewart, Edmund Burns, Charles Clary, Otto Matieson, Mack Swain and Arthur Housman. The film was released on October 24, 1926 by Fox Film Corporation. Little is known about Henry Leverage, the author of the original novel, except that he served prison time in Sing Sing for car theft.

Plot
A person is murdered after receiving a weird phone call, in which someone is heard whispering in a menacing way. Barry McGill sets out to  uncover the killer's identity before he can kill again. Barry's girlfriend Doris Stockbridge gets a similar phone call, and tells Barry that she thinks she is to be the killer's next victim. Barry teams up with two fumbling detectives named McCarthy and Cassidy and a bloodhound, and the bloodhound winds up being more effective than the detectives. Barry manages to capture and unmask the killer before he succeeds in murdering Doris. The culprit(s) turns out to be actually two people....an escaped convict and a mad scientist.

Cast        
Anita Stewart as Doris Stockbridge
Edmund Burns as Barry McGill
Charles Clary as Montgomery Stockbridge
Otto Matieson as Bert Norton
Mack Swain as Cassidy 
Arthur Housman as McCarthy
Heinie Conklin as Jasper
Frank Campeau as Andrew Morphy
Scott Welsh as Triggy Drew
Mayme Kelso as Ann Cartwright
Charles Sellon as Tracy Bennett

References

External links
 

1926 films
1920s comedy mystery films
American black-and-white films
American comedy mystery films
American silent feature films
1920s English-language films
Films based on American novels
Films directed by Albert Ray
Fox Film films
Mad scientist films
1926 comedy films
1920s American films
Silent American comedy films
Silent mystery films
Silent horror films